Basoko is a town on the Congo River in the Tshopo Province of the Democratic Republic of the Congo. As of 2009 it had an estimated population of 47,970.

Notable people

George Grenfell, missionary

References

Populated places in Tshopo
Communities on the Congo River